Isochilus is a genus of orchids (family Orchidaceae) with 13 recognized species. They are lowland epiphytes mainly found in Central America, from Cuba and Mexico to Argentina.

Characteristics of this genus include slender canelike stems with narrow distichous flat leaves and small sessile tube flowers carried at the tip of the cane.

Species
I. alatus
I. amparoanus, syn. I. chiriquensisI. aurantiacusI. bracteatusI. brasiliensis, syn. I. linearisI. carnosiflorusI. cernuus, syn. Jacquiniella cernuaI. chiriquensisI. crassiflorus, syn. I. carnosifloruuI. dubius, syn. Scaphyglottis lividaI. elegans, syn. Dimerandra elegansI. fusiformis, syn. Epidendrum fusiformeI. globosus, syn. Jacquiniella globosaI. graminifolius, syn. Maxillariella graminifoliaI. graminoides, syn. Dichaea graminoidesI. grandiflorumI. grandiflorus, syn. Maxillariella cassapensisI. lancifoliusI. langlasseiI. latibracteatusI. leucanthus, syn I. linearisI. linearisI. linifolius, syn Elleanthus linifoliusI. lividus, syn. Scaphyglottis lividaI. majorI. oaxacanusI. pauciflorus, syn. Scaphyglottis dunstervilleiI. peruvianus, syn. I. linearisI. pitalensisI proliferI. proliferus, syn. Scaphyglottis proliferaI. proliferumI. ramosus, syn. Epidendrum ramosumI. smithiiI. teretifolius, syn. Jacquiniella teretifoliaI. unilateralis''

References

External links

 
Epiphytic orchids
Epidendreae genera